A Long Hot Summer is a 1999 Finnish rock comedy film written and directed by Perttu Leppä. It was the most popular youth film of the 1990s in Finland. The film, set in 1980, tells the story of a fictional rock band called Kalle Päätalo. Due to the film's popularity, the band started to tour around the country.

Cast 
  as Paavo "Patu" Taskinen, the manager and lyricist of the band Kalle Päätalo
  as Noora, the driver of Kalle Päätalo
  as Jukka Lajunen, the singer of Kalle Päätalo
 Timo Lavikainen as Kukkonen, the drummer of Kalle Päätalo
 Konsta Hiekkanen as Jimi, the guitarist of Kalle Päätalo
 Olli Sorjonen as Kakkonen, the bassist of Kalle Päätalo
 Aino Seppo as Patu's mother
 Niina Stützle as Sanna, Patu's sister
 Toni Wirtanen as Lärssi, the singer of The Vittupäät
 Harri Tuovinen as Stuube, the bassist of The Vittupäät
 Pauli Rantasalmi as Pate, the drummer of The Vittupäät
  - Patun äiti
 Niina Stützle - Sanna

References

External links 
 
 

1999 comedy films
1999 films
Finnish comedy films
Finnish rock music films
Films directed by Perttu Leppä
Films set in 1980
Films set in Finland
Films shot in Finland
1990s Finnish-language films